Maurizio Milanetto (born 14 July 1953) is an Italian gymnast. He competed at the 1972 Summer Olympics and the 1976 Summer Olympics.

References

1953 births
Living people
Italian male artistic gymnasts
Olympic gymnasts of Italy
Gymnasts at the 1972 Summer Olympics
Gymnasts at the 1976 Summer Olympics
Sportspeople from Padua